Ramziddin Sayidov (born 14 April 1982) is an Uzbekistani judoka.

Participating at the 2004 Olympics, he was stopped in the round of 32 by Siarhei Shundzikau of Belarus.

He won a bronze medal in the middleweight (90 kg) category of the 2006 Asian Games, having defeated Hossein Ghomi of Iran for the bronze medal.

At the 2012 Summer Olympics, he finished in 5th place, after losing to Tuvshinbayar Naidan in the quarter finals and Dimitri Peters in the bronze medal match.

He currently resides in Bukhara.

References

External links
 
 
 2006 Asian Games profile

1982 births
Living people
Uzbekistani male judoka
Uzbeks
Asian Games medalists in judo
Judoka at the 2004 Summer Olympics
Judoka at the 2012 Summer Olympics
Olympic judoka of Uzbekistan
Judoka at the 2006 Asian Games
Judoka at the 2010 Asian Games
Judoka at the 2014 Asian Games
Asian Games bronze medalists for Uzbekistan
Medalists at the 2006 Asian Games
Medalists at the 2010 Asian Games
Medalists at the 2014 Asian Games
20th-century Uzbekistani people
21st-century Uzbekistani people